C. Leonard Allen is the Dean of Bible at Lipscomb University.

Professor
Leonard Allen has taught at several schools, including Fuller Theological Seminary, Biola University, and John Brown University. He was a professor of Christian Studies at Abilene Christian University for 15 years.

Publisher
He has authored and co-authored several books that deal primarily with the history and cultural impact of the Restoration Movement. In February 2000, Leonard Allen founded Leafwood Publishers, a publisher of Christian books on a variety of topics, including theology, culture and dealing with the study of the Bible in Orange, California. In 2005, Abilene Christian University Press purchased Leafwood Publishers and hired Leonard Allen as its director. 
Leonard directed Abilene Christian University Press and Leafwood Publishers until 2014 when he accepted an offer to be the dean of the Bible Department at Lipscomb University.

Dean of Bible
In April 2014, Lipscomb University announced their decision to bring Leonard in as their new Dean of Bible.

Education
B.A. Harding University (1973)
M.A. Harding School of Theology (1975)
Ph.D. University of Iowa (1984)

Publications
Illusions of Innocence: Protestant Primitivism in America, 1630-1875, with Richard T. Hughes, Abilene, Texas: Abilene Christian University Press, 1988. .
Discovering Our Roots: The Ancestry of Churches of Christ, with Richard T. Hughes, Abilene, Texas: Abilene Christian University Press, 1988. .
The Cruciform Church: Becoming a Cross-Shaped People in a Secular World, Abilene, Texas: Abilene Christian University Press, 1990. .
The Worldly Church: A Call for Biblical Renewal, with Richard T. Hughes and Michael R. Weed, Abilene, Texas: Abilene Christian University Press, 1991. .
Distant Voices: Discovering a Forgotten Past for a Changing Church, Abilene, Texas: Abilene Christian University Press, 1999. .
Participating in God's Life: Two Crossroads for Churches of Christ, with Danny Gray Swick, Orange, California: New Leaf Books, 2001. .
Things Unseen: Churches of Christ in (and After) the Modern Age, Siloam Springs, Arkansas: Leafwood Publishers, 2004. .
Contemporaries Meet the Classics on Prayer, West Monroe, Louisiana:Howard Books, 2003. .

Personal life
Leonard is married to Holly Allen. They live together in Nashville, Tennessee.

References

American Christian writers
Abilene Christian University faculty
Harding University alumni
University of Iowa alumni
Living people
Year of birth missing (living people)
People from Benton County, Arkansas
Place of birth missing (living people)